The Ambassador Extraordinary and Plenipotentiary of the Russian Federation to the Federal Republic of Nigeria is the official representative of the President and the Government of the Russian Federation to the President and the Government of Nigeria.

The ambassador and his staff work at large in the Embassy of Russia in Abuja. The post of Russian Ambassador to Nigeria is currently held by Alexey Shebarshin, incumbent since 20 April 2018.

History of diplomatic relations

Diplomatic relations between the Soviet Union and New Zealand were established at the mission level on 12 January 1961. The first ambassador, was appointed on 21 November 1961. With the dissolution of the Soviet Union in 1991, representatives continued to be exchanged between the Russian Federation and Nigeria.

List of representatives (1961 – present)

Representatives of the Soviet Union to Nigeria (1961 – 1991)

Representatives of the Russian Federation to Nigeria (1991 – present)

See also 
 Foreign relations of Russia
 Foreign relations of Nigeria
 Ambassadors of Russia

References

Ambassadors of Russia to Nigeria
Nigeria
Russia